The Beltrami Island State Forest is a state forest located in Lake of the Woods, Roseau, and Beltrami counties, Minnesota. Named after Italian explorer Giacomo Beltrami, it is the second-largest state forest in the Minnesota system after Pine Island State Forest. The majority of the forest is managed by the Minnesota Department of Natural Resources, although a significant portion are tribal lands belonging to the neighboring Red Lake Band of Ojibwe.

French explorers came to the area around 1730 in their search for a route to the Pacific Ocean, retaining control of the area via the fur trade until after 1760, when the British Hudson's Bay Company gained control of the area. The Treaty of 1818 gave the Americans technical control over the area, although the Ojibwe retained control over the land until ceding all their holdings in the Red River Valley as a result of the Treaty of Old Crossing in 1863.

The majority of land in the forest is coniferous swamp dominated by species such as black spruce, tamarack, and northern white cedar, although red pine, jack pine, and aspen exist in upland areas. Much of the pine that characterizes the upland acreage were planted by the federal Civilian Conservation Corps in the 1930s, based out of Norris Camp now located in the Red Lake WMA portion of the forest. Within the perimeters of the forest are the headwaters of the Roseau River, Warroad River, North Branch Rapid River, and Moose River. All rivers ultimately drain northward into Hudson Bay due to the forest's location north of the Laurentian Divide.

Outdoor recreation activities include hiking and mountain biking on provided trails, as well as backcountry camping. Nearby Zippel Bay State Park and adjacent Hayes Lake State Park have facilities suitable for camping.

See also
List of Minnesota state forests

References

External links
Beltrami Island State Forest - Minnesota Department of Natural Resources (DNR)

Minnesota state forests
Protected areas of Lake of the Woods County, Minnesota
Protected areas of Roseau County, Minnesota
Protected areas of Beltrami County, Minnesota
Protected areas established in 1933